Bhishma Pratigna is a 1921 Indian silent film directed by Raghupati Surya Prakash. Prakash also produced the film along with his father Raghupathi Venkaiah Naidu through Star of the East production company. The film stars Surya Prakash as Bhishma and Peggy Castello as Ganga. It is generally considered to be the first Telugu feature film. Some film historians also consider it to be the first feature film produced in South India. The film was released all over India, Burma and Sri Lanka and was a big success. The film was made on a budget of 12,000 (worth 2.2 crore in 2021 prices) and made ₹60,000 in returns.

Cast 

 Raghupathi Surya Prakash as Bhishma
 Peggy Castello as Ganga
 Bunny Osten
 A. Narayanan

Highlights 
Bhishma Pratigna made in 1921 is a silent film. It is the first film made by a Telugu producer. It is generally considered to be the first Telugu feature film.

Raghupathi Venkaiah sent his son R. S. Prakash abroad to learn filmmaking. Prakash has toured Germany, Italy and the United States. He worked as an assistant to Cecil B. DeMillie, the director of Ten Commandments (1923).

After Prakash's return, he founded 'Star of the East', the first film production company in South India. In 1921, Bhishma Pratigna produced a silent film. Prakash not only directed but also played the role of Bhishma in the film. An English woman named 'de Costello' played the role of Ganga.

Later, the father and son made some more films like Matsyavatar, Nandanar (1923), Gajendra Moksham (1923). Later, the famous C. Pullayya and Y. V. Rao started their film career as Prakash's followers.

References

External links 

 

1921 films
Silent films articles needing an image
1921 directorial debut films
1920s historical films
1920s historical drama films
1921 drama films
Indian silent films
Indian fantasy drama films
Indian black-and-white films
Films directed by R. S. Prakash
Silent drama films